Pogar ( or ) is the name of several inhabited localities in Bryansk Oblast, Russia.

Urban localities
Pogar (urban-type settlement), a work settlement in Pogarsky District

Rural localities
Pogar (rural locality), a village in Nadvinsky Selsoviet of Kletnyansky District